Steven Alan Hassan (pronounced ; born 1954 is an American author, educator and mental health counselor specializing in destructive cults (sometimes called exit counseling). He has been described by media as "one of the world's foremost experts on mind control, cults and similar destructive organizations," though social scientists are divided on his work. He is a former member of the Unification Church, founded Ex-Moon Inc. in 1979, and in 1999 founded the Freedom of Mind Resource Center. He has written on the subject of mind control and how to help people who have been harmed by the experience. He created the BITE Model evaluation of controlling social groups to quantify cult-like behavior.

Personal life
Hassan was born in 1954 and raised as a Jew. He is a native of Queens, New York, and as of late 2020, lived in Newton, Massachusetts.

Hassan reported that, at age 19 while pursuing a poetry degree at Queens College, he was deceptively recruited into the Unification Church, and spent 27 months as a member. Hassan was involved in recruiting, fundraising, and political campaigning for the Unification Church. He also claimed to have risen to the rank of assistant director of the Church at their National Headquarters, and personally met with Sun Myung Moon during numerous leadership sessions.

During his time in the Unification Church, Hassan reported living in communal housing and sleeping less than four hours a night. Part of his duties included selling carnations on street corners in New York. In an interview, Hassan reported that he believed Richard Nixon was an archangel, and during the Watergate scandal, he and other members of the Unification Church were involved in prayer and fasting to "prove their loyalty to the president". He also reported surrendering his bank account to the Unification Church, and quitting college and his job to work for the church. Hassan reported that "he was ready to kill or die for" Sun Myung Moon.

In 1976, after working two full days without sleep and driving a van for fundraisers, Hassan became fatigued and fell asleep while driving which resulted in a serious automobile accident that required him to seek medical care; his parents hired counselors to work with him and convinced him to leave the organization through a deprogramming. Hassan later married his first wife but divorced in 1989, and she died by drowning in 1991. He returned to the Jewish faith after leaving the Unification church; He is an active member of a temple in Brookline, Massachusetts. He married a second time and had a son born from the union.

Cult expertise
Hassan is described as "one of the world's foremost experts on mind control, cults and similar destructive organizations" by Salon, and as a cult expert and mind control expert by numerous other media sources. In 1979, following the Jonestown mass suicide and murders, Hassan founded a non-profit organization called "Ex-Moon Inc." The organization consisted of over four hundred former members of the Unification Church. Hassan studied the thought reform theories of Robert Jay Lifton, and concluded that he was "able to see clearly that the Moon organization uses all eight" characteristics of thought reform as described by Lifton. Hassan studied the work of Richard Bandler and John Grinder who developed neuro-linguistic programming, the works of Milton Erickson, Virginia Satir, and Gregory Bateson, and used their works as a basis to develop his own theories on mind control, counseling, and intervention.

Hassan has been assisting people exit destructive cults since 1976 as an exit counselor. Hassan's methods have changed over time, and Hassan has been outspoken against involuntary deprogramming since 1980. In Combatting Cult Mind Control, he stated that "the non-coercive approach will not work in every case, it has proved to be the option most families prefer. Forcible intervention can be kept as a last resort if all other attempts fail." In 1995, Michael Langone questioned Hassan's "humanistic counseling approach." Langone suggested that Hassan's intervention method still "runs the risk of imposing clarity, however subtly" and "thereby manipulating the client."

Hassan graduated from Cambridge College in 1985 where he earned a Master’s degree in counseling psychology. Hassan studied hypnosis and is a member of the American Society for Clinical Hypnosis and the International Society of Hypnosis. Hassan is a member of the Program in Psychiatry and the Law, a Harvard think tank of forensic experts. Hassan wrote his first book, Combatting Cult Mind Control in 1988, where he described his own recruitment as the result of the unethical use of powerful psychological influence techniques by members of the Church.  Hassan's books have been described as "somewhere at the literary crossroads of memoir, self-help guide, and mind-control theory primer."

In 1999, Hassan founded the Freedom of Mind Resource Center. The center is registered as a domestic profit corporation in the Commonwealth of Massachusetts, and Hassan is president and treasurer. The Center has investigated and published research on various groups including Hare Krishnas, Al Qaeda, and Opus Dei.

Hassan has spent several years developing and promoting the adoption of a model to evaluate cult and cult-like groups. In his third book, Freedom of Mind: Helping Loved Ones Leave Controlling People, Cults, and Beliefs (2012), Hassan presents Lifton's and Margaret Singer's models of evaluation alongside his own "BITE model": control of Behavior, Information, Thought and Emotion. Hassan received his doctorate from Fielding Graduate University and published a dissertation in January 2021. His dissertation focused on the BITE Model and was titled, "The BITE Model of Authoritarian Control: Undue Influence, Thought Reform, Brainwashing, Mind Control, Trafficking and the Law". In it, Hassan explains that he developed the model in an effort to measure degrees of exploitative control or undue influence. The model is an attempt to evaluate behavior, information, thought and emotional controls. Describing the model, Hassan told reporters that "I talk about cults being on the continuum, from OK cults that are benign and where you have informed consent, to the unhealthy, destructive, authoritarian types."

Some mainline social scientists believe that Hassan's work lacks academic rigor and is used to fuel hysteria. American sociologists Anson D. Shupe and David G. Bromley are skeptical of the existence of brainwashing and mind control. Sociologists Benjamin Zablocki and Thomas Robbins state that Hassan's brainwashing theories have long been proven false. The evidence, Zablocki and Robbins state, "refutes the effectiveness of all efforts to brainwash anyone—especially through inducing altered states of consciousness."

Hassan has appeared on Nightline, 60 Minutes, CNN, Fox News, CBC News, and in many other media outlets as a commentator on cults. After the 2013 Boston Marathon bombing, Hassan was interviewed by some reporters to explain his view of the bombers' state of mind and how he believed mind control was involved. In August 2018, Hassan delivered a TEDx talk on technology and mind control at TEDxBeaconStreet Salon. In October 2020, Hassan delivered a TEDx MidAtlantic talk on Dismantling QAnon with David Troy, Jim Stewartson, and Desiree Kane. Hassan was also a speaker at additional Ted Talks such as “How to tell if you're brainwashed?"

In October 2019, The Cult of Trump: A Leading Cult Expert Explains How the President Uses Mind Control, was published, which represents a broadening of Hassan's focus from new religious movements into application of his approach into political culture. Hassan stated that he hoped the book would lessen political division. Hassan has been criticized and accused of sensationalism and self-promotion for applying his cult diagnosis framework to politics.

Books 
Combatting Cult Mind Control, 1988.  — reissued 1990 and 2015 (Combating…).
Releasing the Bonds: Empowering People to Think for Themselves, 2000. .
Freedom of Mind: Helping Loved Ones Leave Controlling People, Cults, and Beliefs, 2012. .
The Cult of Trump: A Leading Cult Expert Explains How the President Uses Mind Control, October 2019. .

See also
Anti-cult movement

References

External links
Official website
Dissertation

Living people
American psychology writers
Jewish American social scientists
American psychotherapists
American social sciences writers
Brainwashing theory proponents
Critics of Falun Gong
Critics of the Unification Church
Critics of Scientology
Deprogrammers
Exit counselors
Mind control theorists
Researchers of new religious movements and cults
Cambridge College alumni
American male non-fiction writers
Former Unificationists
1950s births
20th-century American male writers
20th-century American non-fiction writers
21st-century American male writers
21st-century American non-fiction writers